The canton of Naucelles is an administrative division of the Cantal department, southern France. It was created at the French canton reorganisation which came into effect in March 2015. Its seat is in Naucelles.

It consists of the following communes:
 
Besse
Crandelles
Freix-Anglards
Girgols
Jussac
Laroquevieille
Marmanhac
Naucelles
Reilhac
Saint-Cernin
Saint-Chamant
Saint-Cirgues-de-Malbert
Saint-Illide
Saint-Projet-de-Salers
Teissières-de-Cornet
Tournemire

References

Cantons of Cantal